Daria Barbara Kaczmarek (née Zawiałow; born August 18, 1992), known professionally as Daria Zawiałow, is a Polish singer, songwriter and composer, as well as a music journalist for Radio 357 from 2021 to 2022.

Private life 
On 21 May 2016, she married guitarist Tomasz Kaczmarek (born 1983), known for his performances in Cała Gora Barwinków, who currently plays in the singer's band. The couple met while participating in the fourth edition of the X Factor program. After the wedding she adopted her husband's surname, but continues her artistic career under her maiden name.

Discography

Studio albums

References 

1992 births
Polish singers
Polish musicians
Living people
People from Koszalin